Scilla × allenii is a hybrid between two species of flowering plants, both of which are now placed in the genus Scilla. One of the parents is Scilla bifolia. , sources differ as to the identity of the other, which may be either Scilla forbesii (syn. S. siehei) or Scilla luciliae.

Description
Like its parents, Scilla × allenii grows from bulbs and flowers freely in early spring. The flowers are various shades of blue from lilac to violet and are intermediate in size between those of the parents, up to 2.5 cm in diameter when fully open. As with most hybrids, individual plants vary; some have been given cultivar names. 'Frà Angelico', with pale blue flowers, has gained the Royal Horticultural Society's Award of Garden Merit (confirmed 2017).

Taxonomy
The hybrid was first described by G. Nicholson in 1897. The specific epithet allenii refers to the discoverer of the hybrids, James Allen. He noticed them in his garden in Shepton Mallet, England, at the end of the nineteenth century.

At the time the hybrid was named, one of its parents was placed in the genus Chionodoxa. Accordingly a hybrid genus name was used, this species being × Chionoscilla allenii. , the World Checklist of Selected Plant Families regards Chionodoxa as part of Scilla, in which case the hybrid genus name is not needed.

Distribution
The original hybrid was discovered in cultivation in England. Spontaneous occurrence has been reported on the Nif Mountain in İzmir Province, Turkey.

References

External links
 × Chionoscilla at the Pacific Bulb Society web site
 × Chionoscilla allenii at the North American Rock Garden Society web site
 × Chionoscilla allenii 'Fra Angelico' at the Edgewood Gardens web site

allenii
Plants described in 1897